Fourth Dimension is the fourth studio album by power metal band Stratovarius, released on 11 April 1995 through Noise Records. The album is the band's first to feature vocalist Timo Kotipelto as well as the last with keyboardist Antti Ikonen and drummer Tuomo Lassila, thus being the last Stratovarius album to date featuring an all-Finnish line-up. Founding member and guitarist Timo Tolkki, who had served as the band's vocalist for their first three albums, still provided background vocals on Fourth Dimension before handing over lead singing duties to Kotipelto for all subsequent albums. The track "030366" is likely a reference to Tolkki's birthday of 3 March 1966.

Critical reception

Steve Huey at AllMusic described Fourth Dimension as "melodic Euro-metal" and picking up where Dreamspace (1994) left off. He recommended it for fans of Judas Priest, Scorpions and other similar heavy metal bands.

Track listing

Personnel
Timo Kotipelto – lead vocals, background vocals
Timo Tolkki – guitar, background vocals, engineering, mixing, record producer
Antti Ikonen – keyboards
Tuomo Lassila – drums, arrangement (track 10)
Jari Kainulainen – bass guitar
Marko Vaara – background vocals
Kimmo Blom – background vocals
Kimmo Tullila – strings (track 10)
Marika Bister – strings (track 10)
Petteri Poljärvi – strings (track 10)
Antero Manninen – strings (track 10)
Mika Jussila – mastering

References

External links
Fourth Dimension at stratovarius.com

Stratovarius albums
1995 albums
Noise Records albums